Raymond C. Ortlund Sr. (July 9, 1923 – July 22, 2007) and Anne Ortlund (December 3, 1923 – November 4, 2013) were American evangelical speakers and authors, who cofounded Renewal Ministries. Ray was a pastor, author, broadcast radio program host, and Christian speaker who was heard by millions across the nation on the radio program The Haven of Rest. Anne was an organist and author. They wrote numerous books together over their years of ministry including Three Priorities for a Strong Local Church, and Up with Worship.

Education
Anne graduated from University of Redlands majoring in music.
Ray attended North Park University in Chicago, University of Redlands, and University of Puget Sound  in Tacoma, Washington. While attending, he was captain of two football teams and also was an assistant pastor at four churches.
Ray Ortlund graduated from Princeton Theological Seminary in 1950.
Ray was ordained a Presbyterian minister.
At Princeton Theological seminary, one of his key mentors was Donald G. Barnhouse.

Ministry
Raymond C. Ortlund Sr.'s first work as a pastor was in Christiana, Pennsylvania and, following that, at East Glenville Church, Scotia, New York. He was part of a two-month pastor exchange program in 1959, when he worked in England. Returning from England, Ray served as Senior Pastor at Lake Avenue Congregational Church in Pasadena, California from September 1959 to the late 1970s. The Sunday morning services at Lake Avenue Congregational Church were broadcast over radio station KRLA. After 20 years at Lake Avenue, Ray and Anne founded Renewal Ministries, and they traveled around the world teaching about renewal and revival among God's churches. As a special speaker, Ray was a key part of the revival movement at Wheaton College in 1970. He also served as a teaching pastor at Mariner's Church in Newport Beach, California in the 1980s.
For a number of years, Ortlund wrote a weekly column for the Pasadena Star-News called Out of a Pastor's Study.

Anne was the organist for the Old Fashioned Revival Hour radio broadcast with Dr. Charles E. Fuller and The Joyful Sound program. In addition to her many books, she wrote a number of hymns, including "Macedonia," which was selected as the theme hymn for Billy Graham's World Congress on Evangelism in Berlin in 1966.

Ray hosted the Haven of Rest radio broadcast (now called Haven Today) for 19 years.
The National Religious Broadcasters Hall of Fame inducted Ray in 2008 for his years of hosting the Haven of Rest.

Personal
Ray was born in Des Moines, Iowa to Swedish-American parents, and was the youngest of five children. He served in the US Navy in World War II for three and a half years. Ray and Anne met at a prayer group at the University of Redlands in 1944, during a home stay between deployments. After the war, they were married at the Fourth Presbyterian Church in Washington, D.C. and honeymooned in the Shenandoah Valley. Anne is the daughter of U.S. Brigadier General Joseph B. Sweet. Their son Raymond C. Ortlund, Jr. took over Renewal Ministries and serves as President of the organization, and served as the founding pastor of Immanuel Church in Nashville, Tennessee. Raymond Ortlund Jr.'s youngest son Gavin Ortlund runs a YouTube apologetics channel called TruthUnites.

Death
Ray died on July 22, 2007, after a long battle with pulmonary fibrosis, a lung disease. Two memorial services were held; one at Saint Andrew's Presbyterian in Church in Newport Beach on July 27, 2007, and the second at Lake Avenue Congregational Church on July 28, 2007. Anne died in 2013 following several years with kidney disease and bone cancer.

Books
Lord, Make My Life a Miracle – 1995  (by Ray & Anne)
You Don't Have To Quit – 1994  (by Ray & Anne)
In His Presence – 1995 – 3 editions (by Ray & Anne)
Confident in Christ: Discover Who You Are as a Believer – 1989 (by Ray & Anne)
Three Priorities for a Strong Local Church – 1988 – 2 editions  (by Ray & Anne)
A Fresh Start for Your Friendships – 2001  (by Ray & Anne)
Staying Power: How You Can Win In Life's Tough Situations – 1986 (by Ray & Anne)
A Man and His Loves – 1994 (by Ray & Anne)
The Best Half of Life: For You at Age 35-And Older: With Built-In Study Guide − 1988 (by Ray & Anne)
Renewal – 1989 (by Ray & Anne)
How Great Our Joy – 2000 (by Ray & Anne)
Love me with tough love: Disciplines for living together in the Body of Christ – 1979 (by Anne)
Building a great marriage – 1985 (by Anne)
Discipling One Another – 1983 (by Anne)
Disciplines of the Home– 1990 (by Anne)
I Want to See You, Lord – 1998 (by Anne)
The acts of Joanna – 1982 (by Anne)
Disciplines of a Beautiful Woman – 1984 (by Anne)
Disciplines of the Heart: Tuning Your Inner Life to God – 1989 (by Anne)
Children are Wet Cement  – 1981 (by Anne)
The Gentle Ways of the Beautiful Woman – 1996 (by Anne)
My Sacrifice His Fire: Weekday Readings for Women – 2001(by Anne)
Love Me with Stubborn Love: The Why's and How's of Small Groups – 2000(by Anne)
Fix Your Eyes on Jesus – 1991 (by Anne)
Up with Worship: How to Quit Playing Church – 2001 (by Anne)

Magazines
Rx for unfulfilled mothers. (pastor's wife Anne Ortlund), Christian Herald Association, Inc., Feb. 1982

Essays
 How To Begin Again” Ephesians 4:17–32 December 29, 1974

Articles
Out of a Pastor's Study a weekly column for the Pasadena Star-News.

References

American Christian clergy
Princeton Theological Seminary alumni
American evangelicals
People from Los Angeles
American radio personalities
American Presbyterian ministers
Married couples
20th-century American clergy